The Natural History Museum of Oman is a natural history museum, located at the Ministry of Heritage and Culture complex, Al Khuwair, opposite the Zawawi Mosque in Muscat, Oman.

The museum opened on 20 December 1985, and has detailed coverage of Oman's flora and fauna, with displays on indigenous mammals, insects, and birds and botanical gardens. One of the highlights of the museum is the whale hall: it houses the huge skeleton of a sperm whale, which was washed up on the Omani coastline in the 1986. The museum contains marine and animal fossils and ancient mammals such as monkeys and elephants primitive, teeth Deinotherium and Gomphotherium, and stuffed animals:
Arabian leopard. Caracal. Arabian Oryx. Arabian wolf. Arab Red fox. Ghazal skeleton Arabic. Ibex Arabic. Flamengo. Birds. Crow. Owl. Reptiles. Snakes' lizards. Snails and shells.

New premises
In January 2014, the Ministry of Heritage and Culture announced plans to build new premises for the museum, the project will consist of three floors with a gross area rated to 5,000 square meters. The first floor is specialised for exhibiting marine environments such as sandy coasts, mangroves, rocky coasts and coral reef environments as well as the geological history of the Sultanate's seas while the second floor displays wild environments such as mammals, insects, birds, valleys, caves and water springs in addition to the geological history of Oman.

The third floor is specialised for showcasing information about the solar system, planets, space and meteors. The museum includes lectures halls and temporary exhibitions. Additionally, it has well equipped educational halls that will be used for workshops and educational programmes. The museum includes five fundamental scientific sections specialised for research, records, studies, and archives works.

References

1985 establishments in Oman
Museums established in 1985
Natural history museums
Museums in Muscat, Oman
Natural History Museum